Sir Roger Edward Sims  (born 27 January 1930) is a British Conservative politician.

Early life and education
Sims was born the son of Herbert William Sims and Annie Amy Savidge. He was educated at City Boys' Grammar School in Leicester, and St Olave's Grammar School in London.

Political career
Sims fought Shoreditch and Finsbury at the 1966 and 1970. He was MP for Chislehurst between February 1974 and May 1997, when he retired.

He was Parliamentary Private Secretary to William Whitelaw during Margaret Thatcher's government.

Outside Parliament
Between 1960 and 1972, Sims was a justice of the peace in Bromley. He was Deputy Chairman from 1970 to 1972, and Chairman of the Juvenile Panel from 1971 to 1972.

Honours
Sims was made a Knight of the British Empire in 1996.

Personal life
In 1957, Sims married Angela Mathews; the couple had two sons and a daughter. Mathews died in 2015.

Sims lives in Petts Wood, Bromley; his recreations are swimming and music, especially singing. He was a member of the Royal Choral Society from 1950 to 2008.

References 

Living people
1930 births
Conservative Party (UK) MPs for English constituencies
UK MPs 1974
UK MPs 1974–1979
UK MPs 1979–1983
UK MPs 1983–1987
UK MPs 1987–1992
UK MPs 1992–1997
People educated at City of Leicester Boys' Grammar School
People educated at St Olave's Grammar School
Knights Bachelor
Politicians awarded knighthoods